A corporate lawyer or corporate counsel is a type of lawyer who specializes in corporate law. Corporate lawyers working inside and for corporations are called in-house counsel.

Roles and responsibilities 
The role of a corporate lawyer is to ensure the legality of commercial transactions, advising corporations on their legal rights and duties, including the duties and responsibilities of corporate officers.  In order to do this, they must have knowledge of aspects of contract law, tax law, accounting, securities law, bankruptcy, intellectual property rights, licensing, zoning laws, and the laws specific to the business of the corporations that they work for.  In recent years, controversies involving well-known companies such as Walmart and General Motors have highlighted the complex role of corporate lawyers in internal investigations, in which attorney–client privilege could be considered to shelter potential wrongdoing by the company. If a corporate lawyer's internal company clients are not assured of confidentiality, they will be less likely to seek legal advice, but keeping confidences can shelter society's access to vital information. 

The practice of corporate law is less adversarial than that of trial law.  Lawyers for both sides of a commercial transaction are less opponents than facilitators. One lawyer (quoted by Bernstein) characterizes them as "the handmaidens of the deal". Transactions take place amongst peers.  There are rarely wronged parties, underdogs, or inequities in the financial means of the participants. Corporate lawyers structure those transactions, draft documents, review agreements, negotiate deals, and attend meetings.

The areas of corporate law a corporate lawyer experiences depend from the geographic location of the lawyer's law firm and the number of lawyers in the firm.  A small-town corporate lawyer in a small firm may deal in many short-term jobs such as drafting wills, divorce settlements, and real estate transactions, whereas a corporate lawyer in a large city firm may spend many months devoted to negotiating a single business transaction.  Similarly, different firms may organize their subdivisions in different ways.  Not all will include mergers and acquisitions under the umbrella of a corporate law division, for example.

Some corporate lawyers become partners in their firms. Others become in-house counsel for corporations. Others migrate to other professions such as investment banking and teaching law.

Some publications read by those in the profession include Global Legal Studies, Lawyers Weekly, and the National Law Journal.

Salary 
The salary of a corporate lawyer can vary widely: those employed by major international law firms ("BigLaw" firms) earn starting salaries of US$ 215,000 / year, which rise every year with experience (this amount excludes any additional bonus payments). Depending on the geographical location, the starting salary may be closer to US$ 160,000 / year if the market is secondary. Attorneys employed at smaller firms tend to earn smaller salaries.

See also 
 Corporate law
 Enterprise legal management
 General counsel

References

Further reading 
 

Lawyers by type